Chromodoris willani, commonly known as Willan's chromodoris, is a species of sea slug, a dorid nudibranch, a shell-less marine gastropod mollusk in the family Chromodorididae. The species is named for the renowned nudibranch taxonomist Dr. Richard C. Willan.

Distribution
This nudibranch is found in the Western Pacific Ocean, from Indonesia and the Philippines to Vanuatu.

Description 

Chromodoris willani is similar in appearance to Chromodoris lochi, Chromodoris boucheti and Chromodoris dianae. This species can be distinguished by the very prominent white specks found on the gills and rhinophores.

Individuals in this species can range in color from dark blue to a translucent white. All have black stripes with the center-most stripe typically being non-continuous.

Ecology
Chromodoris willani, like many other nudibranchs, feeds on sponges. It has been reported to eat Cacospongia mycofijiensis and Semitaspongia, both in the family Thorectidae.

References

External links
 

Chromodorididae
Gastropods described in 1982